Jean Bélony Murat (born 29 October 1979, known by his stage name BélO) is a Haitian composer and guitarist. The songs in his first album Lakou trankil (Quiet Streets) explain and reflect the problems Haitians face. BélO is popular in Europe and Africa where he won the Discovery RFI Prime in April 2006. This award had already helped other artists like Tiken Jah Fakoly and Rokia Traoré to reveal their talent in the music industry. BélO's musical approach is influenced by other Caribbean styles but mostly by reggae and jazz.

Early years
Jean Bélony Murat was born on October 29, 1979, at Croix-des-Bouquets in the north of Port-au-Prince, the capital of Haiti. He grew up at Pétion-Ville an area where music has an important role in the Haitian community. He started to sing at a very young age and at 11 years old interpreted Buju Banton, his idol. In 1994, he and his friend formed the Mega Boys that was not very successful. In 1997, he met Fabrice Rouzier and San, two artists who encouraged him to play an instrument. At first, he chose the bass but changed later to the guitar. He went to university in 2001 where he studied accounting for four years. Then he was ready to devote his life to music and released his first album in 2005.

Music
After Lakou trankil, the first album that had success locally and internationally, BélO released Reference. This is close to reggae and has a touch of pop and jazz. He exposed the social problems of humankind, such as violence, AIDS and homeless children. BélO is an ambassador of the Haitian music; he shows love and affection for his homeland. In his songs he is making society aware of its problems and is proposing solutions.

References
 "Bélo : « les Haïtiens sont aussi Africains »" at Afrik.com, 28 April 2007
 Bélo, la musique au service d'Haïti : « C'est pour dire au monde ce que mon pays signifie pour moi » - Musique - France - Caraïbes - Afrique
 RFI Musique - Reportage - BélO à Paris
 FRONTLINE/WORLD . Rough Cut . Haiti: BélO's Song of Peace | PBS

Living people
1979 births
21st-century Haitian male singers
People from Port-au-Prince